Mycobacterium chlorophenolicum is a species of the phylum Actinomycetota (Gram-positive bacteria with high guanine and cytosine content, one of the dominant phyla of all bacteria), belonging to the genus Mycobacterium.

Type strain: strain PCP-I = ATCC 49826 = CIP 104189 = DSM 43826 = HAMBI 2278 = IEGM 559 = IFO (now NBRC) 15527 = JCM 7439 = NRRL B-16528.

References

External links
Type strain of Mycobacterium chlorophenolicum at BacDive -  the Bacterial Diversity Metadatabase

Acid-fast bacilli
chlorophenolicum
Bacteria described in 1994